Jon Carl Hohman (October 23, 1942 – August 2, 2018) was a player in the American Football League for the Denver Broncos in 1965 and 1966 as a guard. He played at the University of Wisconsin–Madison. He was also an all star and Grey Cup champion in the Canadian Football League with the Hamilton Tiger-Cats.

References

1942 births
2018 deaths
Denver Broncos (AFL) players
Hamilton Tiger-Cats players
People from Antigo, Wisconsin
Players of American football from Wisconsin
Wisconsin Badgers football players